The 2017 Big West Conference women's basketball tournament will take place March 7–11, 2017, at two venues in the Los Angeles area. The first two rounds are scheduled for Walter Pyramid in Long Beach, while the semifinals and championship will be held at the Honda Center in Anaheim. The winner of the tournament will receive the conference's automatic bid to the 2017 NCAA Women's Division I Basketball Tournament.

Seeds

Schedule

Bracket

See also
 2017 Big West Conference men's basketball tournament

References

External links
2017 Big West Women's Basketball Championship

Big West Conference women's basketball
Big West